Brockweir Halt was a request stop on the former Wye Valley Railway. It was opened to the public on 19 August 1929. It closed in 1959 when passenger services were withdrawn from the line. It was situated just north of Brockweir bridge. Nothing now remains of the trackbed because of the realignment of the A466.

References

Disused railway stations in Monmouthshire
Former Great Western Railway stations
Railway stations in Great Britain opened in 1929
Railway stations in Great Britain closed in 1959
Wye Valley Railway